McCarrell is a surname.

Surname
Chris McCarrell (born 1991), American actor and singer
Nicholas McCarrell (born 1982), known as Aqua, American record producer and composer

Middle name
Alexander McCarrell Patch, known as Alexander Patch (1889 – 1945), American Army general
Marion McCarrell Scott (1843 - 1922), American educator and government advisor

See also

Carrell
Mac Cearbhaill
McCardell
Graeme McCarrel
McCarroll
McGarrell

Anglicised Irish-language surnames